The 1939–40 Serie A season was won by Ambrosiana-Inter.

Teams
Fiorentina and Venezia had been promoted from Serie B.

Final classification

Results

Top goalscorers

References and sources 

Almanacco Illustrato del Calcio - La Storia 1898-2004, Panini Edizioni, Modena, September 2005

External links
  - All results on RSSSF Website.

Serie A seasons
Italy
1939–40 in Italian football leagues